Coralie de Burgh, Lady Kinahan (16 September 1924 – 31 July 2015) was a British Irish painter who won a bronze medal at the 1948 Olympic Exhibition. Born Coralie Isabel de Burgh to Captain Charles de Burgh, DSO and Isobel Caroline Berkeley de Burgh, she died on 31 July 2015 aged 90. In 1950 she married Ulster Unionist MP Robin Kinahan, with whom she had five children. With her husband she bought and restored Castle Upton at Templepatrick as their family home. One of her children, Danny, is also an Ulster Unionist MP.

References

1924 births
2015 deaths
British painters
Olympic competitors in art competitions
British women painters
Irish women painters
20th-century British women artists
20th-century Irish women artists
21st-century British women artists
21st-century Irish women artists
20th-century British painters
20th-century Irish painters
21st-century British painters
21st-century Irish painters